How to Get a Council House is a British documentary series shown on Channel 4. It is about the difficulty in gaining council housing, due to the long waiting list and not enough housing.

Series 1

Episode 1 
Air date 1 August 2013

Episode 2 
Air date 8 August 2013

Episode 3 
Air date 15 August 2013

Series 2

Episode 1 
Air date 16 April 2014

Episode 2 
Air date 23 April 2014

Episode 3 
Air date 30 April 2014

Series 3

Episode 1 
Air date 8 July 2015

Episode 2 
Air date 13 July 2015

Episode 3 
Air date 20 July 2015

Series 4

Episode 1 
Air date 9 May 2016

Episode 2 
Air date 17 May 2016

Episode 3 
Air date 24 May 2016

References

External links 

Channel 4

2013 British television series debuts
2016 British television series endings
2010s British documentary television series
Channel 4 documentary series
English-language television shows